Porthcawl is a town and community on the south coast of Wales in the county borough of Bridgend,  west of the capital city, Cardiff and  southeast of Swansea. Historically part of Glamorgan and situated on a low limestone headland on the South Wales coast, overlooking the Bristol Channel, Porthcawl developed as a coal port during the 19th century, but its trade was soon taken over by more rapidly developing ports such as Barry. Northwest of the town, in the dunes known as Kenfig Burrows, are hidden the last remnants of the town and Kenfig Castle, which were overwhelmed by sand about 1400.

Toponymy
 is a common Welsh element meaning "harbour" and the  here refers to "sea kale", which must have grown in profusion or even been collected here. Local folk etymology holds the cawl to be a corruption of Gaul, and that the area was an ancient landing point for Gaulish and Breton, or later Frankish and Norman knights.

Holiday resort

Porthcawl is a holiday resort in South Wales and is home to a large static caravan park known as Trecco Bay, which is owned and operated by Parkdean Resorts. It has an extensive promenade and several beaches, two of which are Blue Flag beaches: a tourist-oriented beach at Trecco Bay, at the east end of the town; a sandy beach at Rest Bay, which lies to the northwest of the town; and the quiet and sandy Pink Bay leading out towards Sker Point where a tarmac-covered car park serves a sandy beach.

There are many hotels (including the prominent Seabank Hotel) and guest houses as well as a funfair called Coney Beach. Four rocky points line the shore: Hutchwns Point [sic], Porthcawl Point (on which a lighthouse stands), Rhych Point and Newton Point.

Porthcawl, like many British resorts, has suffered a decline in its holiday trade over recent years, especially since most of the South Wales Valleys coal pits closed. A major feature of the summer was the miners' fortnight, when large numbers of miners took their annual break.

Local attractions
Tourist attractions in the area include sandy beaches, a grand pavilion, a funfair named Coney Beach (modelled on Coney Island in New York), a museum and three golf courses.And the site of the former black obelisk.

Porthcawl Promenade
Built in 1887 to commemorate Queen Victoria's Golden Jubilee, Porthcawl's promenade runs along the seafront from Lock's Common in the west to the harbour, before joining the Eastern Promenade and leading to Coney Beach and Griffin Park. The promenade was restored in 1996. There are many cafes, bars, restaurants and hotels along the promenade, which offers views across the Bristol Channel.

The Grand Pavilion, built at a cost of £25,000 in 1932, is the venue for popular shows, including the annual pantomime. The singer, actor and civil rights activist Paul Robeson once performed 'live' at the Pavilion via a transatlantic telephone link.

Controversial luxury flats now dominate the seafront on the site previously occupied by the Esplanade Hotel, which dated back to the late 1880s. The Royal Society of Architects in Wales awarded 'Esplanade House' a Welsh Housing Design Award in 2006, but the architecture has proved unpopular with many local residents who have nicknamed it "the bottle bank".

Harbour Quarter
Porthcawl Lifeboat Station, purpose-built in 1995, is situated near the harbour. The station operates an Atlantic 85-class lifeboat and a D-class IB1 inflatable lifeboat. 'Cosy Corner' is a park area, which over the years has housed a theatre, cinema, roller skating rink and ballroom. The Jennings Building, built in 1832, is a grade II listed building and Wales' oldest maritime warehouse, and is currently vacant. The building was identified as a potentially important facility as part of the Porthcawl Regeneration Strategy. It now houses three hospitality businesses, each unique in their own right.

At the end of Porthcawl jetty stands a white lighthouse built in 1860. The lighthouse is currently in use as a navigational aid. Porthcawl Lighthouse was the last coal and gas-powered lighthouse in the UK. It switched to being powered by North Sea gas in 1974, before becoming powered by electricity in 1997. The jetty and surrounding area are popular spots for sea fishing.

The historic ships the PS Waverley, the last seagoing paddle steamer in the world, and the MV Balmoral sail from this area during the summer months.

Governance
At the local level, Porthcawl is administered by Porthcawl Town Council. The council consists of 19 town councillors, elected from five community wards, East Central, West Central, Newton, Nottage and Rest Bay.

Prior to 1996, Porthcawl was divided into the Porthcawl East and Porthcawl West wards, electing a total of seven councillors to Ogwr Borough Council. Subsequent to the creation of Bridgend County Borough Council and as a result of The County Borough of Bridgend (Electoral Arrangements) Order 1998, the town was divided into five county wards corresponding to the town council wards: Newton, Nottage, Porthcawl East Central, Porthcawl West Central and Rest Bay. These elect a total of five county councillors.

Porthcawl is part of the Bridgend constituency for elections to the Welsh Government and UK Parliament.

Education
There are 6 schools in Porthcawl: 4 primary schools, 1 comprehensive school and 1 private school.

Porthcawl Comprehensive School
Porthcawl Comprehensive School on the western side of the town has approximately 1,500 pupils, ages 11–18 and 80 teaching staff. The headteacher is Mr. A. J. Slade.
Both Ruth Jones and Rob Brydon attended this school.
The Chairperson of the Governing body is Mrs A. Thomas.
Porthcawl Comprehensive School is the only school to have received a new Band 1 assessment in the Bridgend County from the Welsh Government.

St Clare's School
St Clare's School, Newton is an coeducational independent school, located in the village of Newton (an eastern part of Porthcawl), in Bridgend County Borough, South Wales. The school provides preparatory, secondary and tertiary education leading to GCSE and A-level qualifications. Originally a Roman Catholic girls' school, the school is now owned and operated by the Cognita Group.

St John's School
St John's School was a coeducational independent school, located in the village of Newton. The school provided preparatory, secondary and tertiary education leading to GCSE qualifications. The school closed at the end of July 2014

Nottage Primary School
Nottage Primary School is a state school located in Porthcawl. It provides education for ages 3–11 and is currently participating in the Foundation Phase. Nottage Primary School is a large primary school, with approximately 500 pupils, surrounded by extensive grounds. It has a conservation area and is in the process of building a pond. It has a large outdoor play area and a sensory garden. There is an outdoor classroom which is used for a range of activities.

West Park Primary School
West Park Primary School is a state school located in the village Nottage, Porthcawl. The school was built and opened for teaching in 1971 and has since been extended to incorporate the growing needs of the surrounding area and community. The school has been awarded the 'Eco-schools Green Flag' and the 'BECTA ICT excellence award'.

Porthcawl Primary School
Porthcawl Primary School is a state school located in Porthcawl. The school is a mixed school for boys and girls between the ages of 3 to 11 years which includes a Foundation Phase Area admitting pupils of nursery age.

Newton Primary School
Newton Primary School is a state school located in Porthcawl. The school is a mixed school with approximately 235 pupils on role.

Musical establishments
The Porthcawl Male Voice Choir, or Côr Meibion Porthcawl, is a male voice choir formed in 1980 with 17 members. The choir currently has 45 members. Each year the choir performs with a celebrity guest, the latest of whom was Leslie Garrett.

Beaches

Porthcawl has seven beaches.

Newton Beach on the eastern edge of Porthcawl is a long sandy and rocky beach, backed by the Newton Burrows and Merthyr Mawr sand dunes, a designated Site of Special Scientific Interest, and ending at the mouth of the River Ogmore at Ogmore-by-Sea.

Trecco Bay is a large, sandy and rocky Blue Flag beach. Trecco Bay holiday park is situated alongside the beach.

Sandy Bay, with the area in front of the fairground known as Coney Beach, is a large sheltered and sandy beach.

Seafront Beach, also known as Town Beach, is a rocky beach in the centre of Porthcawl which was partly tarmaced over in the 1980s to repair sea defences.

Rest Bay is a sandy Blue Flag beach situated in the west of Porthcawl.

Pink Bay has a steep pebble bank down onto a flat beach edged by a rocky shoreline. These rocks have a unique pink marbling effect – hence the name Pink Bay.

Sker Beach is the most westerly beach in Porthcawl and is accessible only by walking from Rest Bay or Kenfig National Nature Reserve. A plaque, in memory of the 47 lives lost on the S.S. Samtampa, capsized and wrecked in heavy seas, and the Mumbles RNLI life boat which attempted rescue on 23 April 1947, is visible at low tide.

Five rocky points line the Porthcawl shore: From east to west these are Newton Point, Rhych Point, Porthcawl Point, Hutchwns Point and Sker Point.

Scheduled monuments
There are three scheduled monuments in Porthcawl Community area. including a prehistoric site and a Roman villa.

Hutchwns round barrow (SS813776) Only partly surviving mound of a Bronze Age round barrow, It is near a public par and a modern standing stone has been placed alongside it.
Dan-y-Graig Roman villa (SS840780) This Roman villa, a rare feature in Wales, dates mainly to 3rd-4th centuries and is in Newton. The site includes agricultural buildings. It was partly excavated in 1985-86.
Nottage Court inscribed stone (SS820781) A Roman milestone with 3 Latin inscriptions plus possible Ogham Its current location is in a garden at Nottage Court, moved there in the 19th century, from SS763890, now Port Talbot Docks.

Newton village
Newton village dates from the 12th century. St. John's Church, founded by the Knights of the Order of St. John of Jerusalem 800 years ago, and originally built as a fortress, overlooks the village green.

The Jolly Sailor pub, the oldest in Porthcawl and the Ancient Briton pub also overlooks the green.

To the south of the church lies St John's Well, the water from which is reputed to have healing properties.

Newton village homed St John's School, an independent day school established in 1921 and which closed in c2016. Newton is also home to St Clare's School which is also an independent day school which was established in 1938 by the Poor Clares order of nuns.

Festivals
Porthcawl Town Carnival takes place annually in July. A procession of themed floats and acts make their way around the town, collecting money for charity, and competing for the prize of the best float. The procession makes its way to the carnival field where there are stalls, a fun fair, and live acts to be enjoyed.

The Porthcawl Jazz & Blues Festival is held annually in April hosting a variety of musical performances, workshops and family events over a weekend.

Surf Cult runs for a week in September. Events include surf contests, music, art, fashion and film plus an outdoor market. The festival ends with the legendary Surfers' Ball.

The Elvis Festival runs every September, attracts Elvis tribute artists and devotees from across the world. It is recognized as the biggest gathering of Elvis fans in Europe and maybe in the world. The Elvis Festival was selected as one of the UK's top twenty summer festivals by The Times in 2008.

Sports
Porthcawl is one of the top locations in Wales for surfing with both national and regional competitions held at Rest Bay.

Other alternative sports like skateboarding and rollerblading are also popular with the former PADS skate park by the Harbour and the new bowl park off .  There are three golf courses to the north of the town including Royal Porthcawl Golf Club, which attracts players from around the world.

Porthcawl is home also home to football side Porthcawl Town Athletic F.C. which boasts a 1st, Reserve and 3rd team as well as numerous junior teams. Rugby also has a rich heritage with Rugby Union team Porthcawl RFC

Porthcawl is also home to lifeguard clubs that train the lifeguards that guard Coney Beach and Trecco Bay as well as Rest Bay and Sker beaches.

Porthcawl hosts a free weekly Parkrun at 9am each Saturday. It starts on the Lower Promenade in front of the Grand Pavilion, heads out to Rest Bay and finishes near the Pier.

The famous world championship boxing match between WBC world featherweight champion Howard Winstone and his challenger, Jose Legra, which Legra won by fifth round technical knockout, was held in Porthcawl on 24 July, 1968.

Regeneration
Porthcawl waterfront is proposed for substantial regeneration as part of the 7 Bays Project. The Planning Guidance outlines proposals that will result in the comprehensive regeneration of Porthcawl's waterfront, stretching from Cosy Corner and the harbour in the south, to Trecco Bay in the east. The plan includes the construction of new sea defences, enabling regeneration of the area to take place and also protecting more than 440 existing properties from flood risk.

The first phase of Porthcawl's regeneration, Porthcawl Harbourside, was launched on 28 March 2008. A  site has been marketed to developers for a substantial mixed use scheme. The scheme is envisaged to include a new foodstore, extra retail space, leisure and community facilities, up to 450 houses/flats, a new promenade, town square and car parking.

The scheme forms part of the 7 Bays Project for Porthcawl and the first phase in the regeneration of the whole waterfront. The regeneration project is one of the largest of its kind in the country.

Transport

Road - the A4229 road links the town to junction 37 of the M4 motorway
Bus - First Cymru's X2 service runs every half an hour to Cardiff Central via Bridgend, Cowbridge and West Cardiff.
Rail - the nearest station is Pyle, although Bridgend railway station is the nearest mainline station. Porthcawl's own railway station at the top of Station Hill closed in 1962.

Notable people
See :Category:People from Porthcawl

Air crash
On 11 February 2009, two RAF Grob Tutor training aircraft collided over the area, one landing in Kenfig and the other landing in Margam. Two instructors and two teenage air cadets died in the incident.

References

Further reading
Alun Morgan (1987), Porthcawl Newton and Nottage, a Concise Illustrated History, D Brown and Sons Ltd., Cowbridge.

External links

 Official tourism guide to Porthcawl
 

 
Swansea Bay (region)
Communities in Bridgend County Borough
Coast of Bridgend County Borough
Towns in Bridgend County Borough
Seaside resorts in Wales
Surfing locations in Wales
Populated coastal places in Wales